"Dream On"  is a song by Scottish recording artist Amy Macdonald. The song was released as a digital download on 6 January 2017 through Mercury Records as the lead single from her fourth studio album Under Stars (2017). The song has peaked at number 28 on the Scottish Singles Chart.

Music video
A music video to accompany the release of "Dream On" was first released onto YouTube on 13 January 2017 at a total length of three minutes and twenty-three seconds.

Track listing

Charts

Weekly charts

Release history

References

2017 singles
2017 songs
Amy Macdonald songs
Songs written by Amy Macdonald